were a series of elaborate questionnaires distributed to the lands of King Philip II of Spain in the Viceroyalty of New Spain in North America. They were done so, upon his command, from 1579–1585.

Format
These questionnaires had upward of fifty questions that requested information on various aspects of the Spanish colonial life in each region or major town, in order to govern it more effectively.  Thus, these questionnaires had more of an administrative and functional purpose as opposed to intellectual gain.  These questionnaires are oftentimes considered the first statistical study of the New World, since they attempted to chart the lands, peoples, and trade routes. The value of these questionnaires continues to grow over time due to these surveys being first-person information.

Purpose
These extensive questionnaires have provided incredibly rich information with regard to 16th century ethnic groups in Mesoamerica.  These questionnaires included questions regarding politics, taxes paid, the natural environment and resources, population history, settlement patterns, the language, markets and trade, native history and customs, maps, and the progress of the “missionization” program. These maps were created by indigenous people, sailors, local officials, and other individuals in New Spain.  Some of these maps that were requested were often commissioned by artists and have now been linked to the Casta paintings of the period.

Result
These surveys were reported back to Spain's King Phillip II and allowed the Spanish monarchy to have better control over the people and the politics in New Spain.  However, not all major cities and regions are accounted for because not all local officials returned the questionnaire or perhaps their response did not survive.  Along with this, since all people were allowed to send in a map it showed the bias of each social class and represented common issues of the time.  Nevertheless, this scientific process of data collection and statistics essentially built a bridge between two continents.

Today, many of the manuscript versions of these questionnaires are found in four different locations: The General Archive of the Indies in Seville, the Real Academia de la Historia in Madrid, the Benson Library at the University of Texas at Austin, and the University of Glasgow Library.

See also
Cartography of Latin America
Mesoamerican literature
:Category:History of New Spain

Further reading
Acuña, René. Relaciones geográficas del siglo XVI. Mexico City: UNAM 1982.
Cline, Howard F., "The Relaciones Geográficas of the Spanish Indies, 1577-1586." Hispanic American Historical Review 44, (1964) 341–374.
Cline, H.F. "A Census of the Relaciones Geográficas, 1579-1612." Handbook of Middle American Indians, vol. 12: 324-69. Austin: University of Texas Press 1972.
Cline, H.F. "The Relaciónes Geográficas of the Spanish Indies, 1577-1648." Handbook of Middle American Indians, vol. 12: 183-242. Austin: University of Texas Press 1972.
Cline H.F. "The Relaciones Geográficas of Spain, New Spain, and the Spanish Indies: An Annotated Bibliography." Handbook of Middle American Indians vol. 12, 370-95. Austin: University of Texas Press 1972.
Isaac, Barry L. "Witnesses to Demographic Catastrophe: Indigenous Testimony in the Relaciones Geográficas of 1577-86." Ethnohistory 62 (nno. 2 (2015): 309-31.
Mundy, Barbara E., The Mapping of New Spain: Indigenous Cartography and the Maps of the Relaciones Geográficas. Chicago: University of Chicago Press 1996.

References

History of New Spain
Data collection
Philip II of Spain
Race in Latin America
1579 in New Spain
1580s in New Spain